Street Riders NYC is a collective that formed in June 2020 during the period of civil unrest following the murder of George Floyd. The group originated in part out of a need for cyclists to protect other protesters from arrest. Founded by Orlando Hamilton and Peter Kerre, the group brings together over 10,000 bicyclists for weekly protests throughout all boroughs of NYC, seeking to raise awareness about systemic racism and police brutality. Made up entirely of volunteers, the group has their own medics, mechanics, and traffic blockers available for assistance on the ride.

List of Justice Rides 

 Brooklyn
 Brooklyn
 June 20, 2020 (started at Times Square, Manhattan; ended at Wagner Park, Manhattan)
 June 27, 2020
 July 4, 2020
 July 11, 2020 (started at Brooklyn Museum, Brooklyn)
 July 18, 2020 (started at the Unisphere in Flushing Meadows Park, Queens; ended at Manhattan)
 July 25, 2020
 August 1, 2020 (started at the Daniel Webster monument in Central Park, Manhattan; ended at Manhattan)
 August 8, 2020
 August 15, 2020
 August 22, 2020 (started at John Paul Jones Park, Bay Ridge, Brooklyn; ended at McCarren Park, Brooklyn)
 September 5, 2020 (started at Prospect Park, Brooklyn; ended at Central Park, Manhattan)
 ?
 October 3, 2020 (started at Bryant Park, Manhattan)
 October 10, 2020
 ?

References

External links
Street Riders NYC

Black Lives Matter
George Floyd protests in the United States
2020 establishments in New York City
Organizations based in New York City
Collectives